The Norwegian Bureau for the Investigation of Police Affairs is a government agency under the Ministry of Justice and the Police. Located in Hamar, it is responsible for investigating reports of misconduct and criminal offenses by members of the Norwegian Police Service and the Norwegian Prosecuting Authority.

References

External links
 Official site

Law enforcement in Norway